Rafael Francisco Amador Campos (born 14 January 1948) is a Colombian lawyer and politician currently serving as Ambassador of Colombia to Russia. A Liberal party politician, he served in Congress as Representative for Cundinamarca on two separate periods of two terms each, first from 1982 to 1990 and then from 1998 to 2006, and was twice elected Senator of Colombia for the same legislative period, first in 1990, and then again in 1991 following the ratification of the 1991 Constitution, and served until 1994.

References

1948 births
Living people
People from Girardot, Cundinamarca
New Liberalism (Colombia) politicians
Colombian Liberal Party politicians
Members of the Chamber of Representatives of Colombia
Members of the Senate of Colombia
Ambassadors of Colombia to Russia
Ambassadors of Colombia to Belarus
20th-century Colombian lawyers
Pontifical Xavierian University alumni
University of Los Andes (Colombia) alumni